Bernard O'Kane is the name of:

 Bernard O'Kane (bishop) (1867–1939), Irish Catholic bishop
 Bernard O'Kane (scholar), Irish Islamic scholar